Houston Aerodrome  is an airport located  northwest of Houston, British Columbia, Canada.

References

Registered aerodromes in British Columbia
Regional District of Bulkley-Nechako